Anthene ruwenzoricus is a butterfly in the family Lycaenidae. It is found in the border region of the Democratic Republic of the Congo and Uganda.

References

Butterflies described in 1911
Anthene